Engineered languages (often abbreviated to engelangs, or, less commonly, engilangs) are constructed languages devised to test or prove some hypotheses about how languages work or might work.  There are at least three subcategories, philosophical languages (or ideal languages), logical languages (sometimes abbreviated as loglangs), and experimental languages.  Raymond Brown describes engineered languages as "languages that are designed to specified objective criteria, and modeled to meet those criteria".

Some engineered languages have been considered candidate global auxiliary languages, and some languages intended as international auxiliary languages have certain "engineered" aspects (in which they are more regular and systematic than their natural language sources).

Logical languages 

Logical languages are meant to allow (or enforce) unambiguous statements.  They are typically based on predicate logic but can also be based on any system of formal logic.  The two best-known logical languages are the predicate languages Loglan and its successor Lojban. They both aim to eliminate syntactical ambiguity and reduce semantic ambiguity to a minimum.  In particular, the grammar of Lojban is carefully engineered to express such predicate logic in an unambiguous manner.

Philosophical languages 

Philosophical languages are designed to reflect some aspect of philosophy, particularly with respect to the nature or potential of any given language. John Wilkins' Real Character and Edward Powell Foster's Ro constructed their words using a taxonomic tree. Vocabularies of oligosynthetic languages, for example Ygyde, are made of  compound words, which are coined from a small (theoretically minimal) set of morphemes. Sonja Lang's Toki Pona is based on minimalistic simplicity.

Experimental languages 

An experimental language is a constructed language designed for the purpose of exploring some element in the theory of linguistics.  Most such languages are concerned with the relation between language and thought; however, languages have been constructed to explore other aspects of language as well. In science fiction, much work has been done on the assumption popularly known as the Sapir–Whorf hypothesis, Suzette Haden Elgin's Láadan is designed to lexicalize and grammaticalize the concepts and distinctions important to women, based on muted group theory.

Examples

See also
Controlled natural language
International auxiliary language
Artistic language
Ithkuil
Lojban

References

External links
Garrett's Links to Logical Languages
Origin of the term "engelang", by And Rosta (CONLANG mailing list post, 19 July 2007)

 
Constructed languages
Interlinguistics